Colpo di Luna is a 1995 Italian drama film written and directed by Alberto Simone. It won a David di Donatello for Best New Director. It was released in the US in 2000 under the name Moon Shadow. It was entered into the 45th Berlin International Film Festival where it won an Honourable Mention.

Plot
Lorenzo, an astrophysicist, has inherited a house in Sicily. He has it restored by Salvatore, an introverted carpenter. Salvatore starts the job with help of his handicapped son. Since work seems to be slow Lorenzo goes and checks on them. He finds out Salvatore has turned the house into a therapeutic community for troubled people. At first Lorenzo is angry but then his good heart prevails.

Cast
 Tchéky Karyo: Lorenzo
 Nino Manfredi: Salvatore
 Isabelle Pasco: Luisa
 Jim van der Woude: Agostino
 Johan Leysen: Titto
 Mimmo Mancini: Filippo
 Paolo Sassanelli: Michele

References

External links

1995 films
1995 drama films
1990s Italian-language films
Italian drama films
1990s Italian films